"Jacques" is a song by English DJ and record producer Jax Jones and Swedish singer Tove Lo. It was released on 28 August 2019 as the lead single from Jones' debut studio album Snacks (Supersize) (2019) and the third single from Lo's fourth studio album Sunshine Kitty (2019). It was written by Jones, Lo, Mark Ralph, and Uzoechi Emenike, and produced by Jax and Ralph.

Music video
The music video for the song alternates between showing Jax Jones playing music on his DJ set and Tove Lo singing.

Background
"Jacques" was confirmed as the second track on Jones' album Snacks (Supersize) on 19 July, and as the seventh track on Lo's album Sunshine Kitty on 2 August. On 26 August, Jones and Lo announced on social media that the song would be released on 28 August.

Charts

References

2019 songs
2019 singles
Jax Jones songs
Tove Lo songs
Songs written by Tove Lo
Songs written by MNEK
Songs written by Jax Jones
Songs written by Mark Ralph (record producer)
Song recordings produced by Mark Ralph (record producer)
Song recordings produced by Jax Jones